Vicary Tyser Gibbs, 6th Baron Aldenham, 4th Baron Hunsdon of Hunsdon (born 9 June 1948), is a British peer, the son of Antony Gibbs, 5th Baron Aldenham. He succeeded to the titles Baron Aldenham and Baron Hunsdon of Hunsdon on 25 January 1986.

He served in the House of Lords from 25 January 1986 until 11 November 1999.

He married Josephine Nicola Fell, on 16 May 1980. They have four children.

Gibbs is the majority shareholder of Elstree Aerodrome.

References

1948 births
Living people
People educated at West Downs School
Vicary
Vicary
4

Aldenham